Sunnyside is a ghost town in Menard County, Texas, United States.

References

External links

Unincorporated communities in Menard County, Texas
Unincorporated communities in Texas
Ghost towns in Central Texas